The Gropoi is a right tributary of the river Teuz in Romania. It flows into the Teuz near Cărand.

References

Rivers of Romania
Rivers of Arad County